Holmen Cemetery (Danish: Holmens Kirkegård) is the oldest cemetery still in use in Copenhagen, Denmark. It was first located next to the naval Church of Holmen in the city centre but relocated to its current site on Dag Hammarskjölds Allé in the Østerbro district in 1666. The cemetery originally served as a burial site for indigent sailors in royal service and their families, complementing the military Garnisons Cemetery, from 1711 located on a neighbouring site.

History
When the anchor forge at Bremerholm was converted into a naval church by Christian IV in 1619, a churchyard was laid out next to it. It remained in use until 1651 but was then, following an extension of the church between 1641 and 1649, relocated to a site outside the Bastioned Fortifications, next to the main road leading in and out of the Eastern City Gate. The grounds had already been in use as a cemetery since 1662 but was inaugurated as the new Holmen Cemetery in 1666.

The existing layout of the cemetery was created by sær F. C. Schmidt in 1798.

Chapel

The chapel at Holmen Cemetery was built in 1902 to the design of architect and professor Ludvig Fenger. He favoured the Historicist styles and in Copenhagen he had already designed St. James' Church (1876–1878) in a Gothic Revival style and St. Mathew's Church (1878–1880) in a Romanesque Revival style. In his design of the chapel at Holmen Cemetery he relied on traditional Nordic stave churches for inspiration.

The chapel is an adapted stave church design, lacking the tall, tower-like appearance which is normally seen in such buildings, but the shingled slate roof, the tarred timber and the carved animal heads are characteristic features.

Battle of Copenhagen memorial
There is a memorial for naval personnel killed in the Battle of Copenhagen from 1802. It consists of a tumulus topped by an obelisk designed by Johannes Wiedewelt.

Interments

See also
 Parks and open spaces in Copenhagen

References

External links

 Official web site
 

Cemeteries in Copenhagen
Lutheran cemeteries
1666 establishments in Denmark
 
Cemeteries established in the 17th century